Shelby Sumpter Singleton, Jr. (December 16, 1931 – October 7, 2009) was an American record producer and record label owner.

Early life
He was born Shelby Sumpter Singleton, Jr. in Waskom, Texas. His parents were Shelby Sumpter Singleton, Sr. and Alvina Marcantel. As a youngster, living in Shreveport, Louisiana, Singleton was known as "Sonny Boy". He graduated from high school at age 15, then attended the Louisiana Business School. After graduating, he joined the Marine Corps and served in the Korean War. He would spend the rest of his life with a metal plate in his head due to an injury suffered while serving there.

Career
After his military discharge he worked in a munitions company, based in Shreveport, Louisiana for five years before being hired to promote Starday Records country music catalog. When a marketing arrangement between Starday and Mercury Records was terminated, Singleton was hired by Mercury to do promotional work. He rose in the company to become a record producer and executive in Mercury's Nashville office. In 1960, he achieved his first hit single, Brook Benton's recording of "The Boll Weevil Song", which became a #2 single on the Billboard Hot 100 chart the following year. Singleton spent nine years at Mercury and its sister label, Smash Records, during which he was involved in producing many hit records, including Leroy Van Dyke's "Walk On By"; "Ahab the Arab" by Ray Stevens; and "Wooden Heart" by Joe Dowell. Singleton also acted as producer for such artists as Jerry Lee Lewis, Roger Miller, Charlie Rich, Dave Dudley, and Brook Benton.

In 1962, Singleton bought the master recording of "Hey Paula" by Jill and Ray, originally released on LeCam Records. He changed their names to Paul & Paula and issued the song on Mercury's sister label, Philips Records. The song spent three weeks at number one on the Billboard Hot 100. By 1966, Singleton was vice-president of Mercury, but resigned to form several music labels, including SSS International and Plantation Records. He achieved his first #1 hit in 1968 with Jeannie C. Riley's "Harper Valley PTA". The following year, Singleton purchased Sun Records and its rock and roll catalog from Sam Phillips. From this point onwards, most of his career was dedicated to releasing and repackaging the Sun catalog, much of which was previously unreleased. Singleton was also on the nominating committee of the Hit Parade Hall of Fame.

Singleton was known to find talent in all parts of the country. For example, The Flatlanders were brought to his attention by freelance producer Royce Clark. In 1972 the Flatlanders traveled from Lubbock to Nashville to record with Clark for Singleton's Plantation label. Singleton and Clark worked closely together in later years, finding and recording undiscovered talent which Clark produced for Singleton's Plantation label, such as Ron Daisley and The County Fair from Long Island, New York.

Private life
Singleton graduated from Byrd High School in Shreveport, Louisiana at the age of 15. Two years later he married Margaret Ebey, who later rose in the country music scene as Margie Singleton. After 16 years of marriage they divorced. Singleton married three more times and had four children: Stephen, Sidney, Shana, and Stuart; and several grandchildren. He married Barbara MacCollum right before achieving fame with "Harper Valley PTA". Shortly after that they were divorced.

Death
Singleton resided in Nashville, where he died, aged 77, on October 7, 2009, following a battle with brain cancer. He had been admitted to St. Thomas Hospital a week earlier after suffering a seizure, according to his longtime friend and associate Jerry Kennedy.

References

Bibliography
Cooper, Daniel (1998). "Shelby Singleton". In The Encyclopedia of Country Music. Paul Kingsbury, Editor. New York: Oxford University Press. p. 485, 

1931 births
2009 deaths
People from Waskom, Texas
Deaths from brain cancer in the United States
Deaths from cancer in Tennessee
Record producers from Texas
American music industry executives
People from Shreveport, Louisiana
People from Nashville, Tennessee
Sun Records
C. E. Byrd High School alumni